Jesse Price (May 1, 1909, Memphis, Tennessee – April 19, 1974, Los Angeles) was an American jazz drummer.

Price began on drums at age 14, and played locally with blues singers, including Ida Cox, and in the Palace Theater pit orchestra, early in his career. He moved to Kansas City in 1934, where he played with George E. Lee, Thamon Hayes, Count Basie (1936), and Harlan Leonard (1939–41). He then moved to Los Angeles, where he worked with Ella Fitzgerald, Louis Armstrong (1943), Stan Kenton (1944), Basie again (1944), Benny Carter, and Slim Gaillard (1949). He recorded with Jay McShann when back in Kansas City again in the 1950s. He led a band at the Monterey Jazz Festival in 1971, which included Harry Edison, Jimmy Forrest and Big Joe Turner.

Price recorded 23 tracks as a leader between 1946 and 1948, most of them for Capitol Records. All are published on a Blue Moon CD: The Singing Drummer Man; Jesse Price. The Complete Recordings 1946–1957 (BMCD 6019).

Discography

As sideman
With B.B. King
1956: Singin' the Blues (Crown)
With Jay McShann
McShann's Piano (Capitol, 1967)

References
Footnotes

General references
Scott Yanow, [ Jesse Price] at AllMusic

1909 births
1974 deaths
American jazz drummers
Musicians from Memphis, Tennessee
20th-century American drummers
American male drummers
Jazz musicians from Tennessee
20th-century American male musicians
American male jazz musicians